Kristine Hanson (born September 23, 1951, in Illinois) is an American television broadcaster who also was Playboy magazine's Playmate of the Month for the September 1974 issue. Her centerfold was photographed by David Chan.

She was previously the host of DIY Network's The Dirt on Gardening.

Hanson has been the weather presenter on KTXL and KCRA in Sacramento, California, on KTVU, KGO, and KRON in San Francisco, and KZST in Santa Rosa, California. She is currently a meteorologist on KOVR in Sacramento, California.

She won an Emmy Award and a first place award for American Women in Radio and Television.

She holds communication studies and theatre arts degrees from California State University, Sacramento and a degree in meteorology from San Francisco State University.

See also
 List of people in Playboy 1970–1979

References

External links 

1970s Playboy Playmates
Weather presenters
1951 births
People from Illinois
Living people
Television anchors from Sacramento, California
American women television journalists
21st-century American women